I'll Be Alright is the third studio album by Canadian country music artist Duane Steele. It was released by Jolt/Royalty Records in August 2000. Singles released from the album include "Make Me Crazy," the title track, "The Goodside of Your Goodbye," "What to Do," "This Is Love," "I-65" and "The Heart of the It Don't Matter."

Track listing
"The Heart of the It Don't Matter" (Don Bell, Jan Robbin, Duane Steele) – 3:08
"Lost in You" (Louis Sedmak, Steele) – 2:50
"I'll Be Alright" (Roy Hurd, Steele) – 4:09
"Make Me Crazy" (Jon Robbin, Steele) – 2:47
"This Is Love" (Steele, Tim Taylor) – 3:00
"The Goodside of Your Goodbye" (Tara Johns, Sedmak, Steele) – 3:19
"I-65" (Robbin, Steele) – 3:43
"Who Am I Gonna Love" (Robbin, Steele) – 3:28
"What to Do" (Robbin, Steele) – 3:14
"Johnny's Dream" (Sedmak, Steele) – 4:20

References

External links
[ I'll Be Alright] at AllMusic

2000 albums
Duane Steele albums
Royalty Records albums